The 1991 Denmark Open in badminton was a three-star tournament held in Solroed, from October 16 to October 20, 1991.

Final results

References

Denmark Open
Denmark